Chateau Avalon is a hotel located in Kansas City, Kansas. Chateau Avalon took its first reservations in June 2004. The idea for the hotel as a local, upscale, vacation destination was developed by Steve Beaumont, a businessman from Shawnee, Kansas. The 62 room hotel features 23 different types of themed rooms separated into categories: Luxury, Adventure and Classic suites.
Named for its creator, Steve Beaumont, the Beaumont Fountain at Chateau Avalon is the largest structural fountain in Kansas City, a city known for fountains. The fountain took a year to build and was dedicated in August 2006.

References

 
 
 

Hotels in Kansas
Buildings and structures in Kansas City, Kansas